Incháustegui is a surname. Notable people with the surname include:

Juan Incháustegui (1938–2019), Peruvian politician and minister 
Mario García Incháustegui (1924–1977), Cuban Ambassador to Japan
Teresa Incháustegui (born 1952), Mexican politician